Diamantino Pereira da Silva (born 29 March 1928), former Portuguese footballer who played as forward.

Football career 

Silva gained 1 cap for Portugal against South Africa 21 November 1953 in Lisbon, in a 3-1 victory.

External links 
 
 

1928 births
Portuguese footballers
Association football forwards
Primeira Liga players
C.F. Os Belenenses players
Portugal international footballers
Possibly living people